Etelvina Andreu Sánchez (born 1969) is the General Director of Consumer and Citizen Services of the Spanish Ministry of Health and Social Politics. In addition to her political career, she has also specialised in research into the pancreas.

Background
Andreu was born in Alicante on 6 March 1969. She holds a degree in physics from the University of Valencia, and a doctoral degree in medicine from the University of Alicante.

Career
She started her professional career as a researcher at the University of Alicante, and later she worked as a professor at the Miguel Hernández University. She co-authored several well-cited papers on the functioning of the pancreas.

In 2004 she was appointed as the representative of the Spanish government (Subdelegada del Gobierno) in Alicante.

In the municipal elections of 2007, Etelvina Andreu Sánchez was the Spanish Socialist Workers' Party (Partido Socialista) candidate for the mayor post of Alicante. She lost the elections by about 4,000 votes to the People's Party (Partido Popular), however this was the best of performance of the socialists in Alicante since 1983.

On 25 April 2008, Etelvina Andreu was appointed the General Director of Consumer and Citizen Services of the Ministry of Health and Social Politics. She is closely linked with the Minister Bernat Soria, with whom she crossed during her academic career.

Selected publications

References 

  

Academic staff of the Miguel Hernández University of Elche
Spanish Socialist Workers' Party politicians
1969 births
Living people
Academic staff of the University of Alicante
21st-century Spanish politicians
21st-century Spanish women politicians
University of Alicante alumni